The Tashtyk culture was Late Iron Age  archaeological culture that flourished in the Yenisei valley in Siberia from the first to the fourth century CE. Located in the Minusinsk Depression, environs of modern Krasnoyarsk, eastern part of Kemerovo Oblast, it was preceded by the Tagar culture.

History
The Tashtyk culture was first surveyed by the Russian archaeologist Sergei Teploukhov. Teploukhov suggested that it had been initially Indo-European dominated, only to become overcome by the Yenisei Kirghiz around the 3rd century AD. The Yenisei Kirghiz are often associated with the Tashtyk culture.

Tashtyk settlements and hill-forts have been unearthed throughout the Yenisei region, particularly the Sayan canyon area. Their most imposing monuments were immense barrows-crypt structures; these have yielded large quantities of clay and metal vessels and ornaments. In addition, numerous petrographic carvings have been found. Some of the graves contained leather models of human bodies with their heads wrapped in tissue and brightly painted. Inside the models there were small leather bags probably symbolising the stomach and containing burned human bones. Scaled-down replicas of swords, arrows and quivers were placed nearby. The animal motifs of the Tashtyk belonged to the Scytho-Altaic style, while they were also under significant Chinese influence.

During his excavations of the Oglahty cemetery south of Minusinsk, Leonid Kyzlasov discovered a number of mummies with richly decorated plaster funerary masks showing Western Eurasian features, though this would not rule out some East Asian admixture, as revealed by ancient DNA (see below). There were also intact fur hats, silk clothes, and footwear (now in the Hermitage Museum, St. Petersburg).

Genetics
In 2009, a genetic study covering specimens from the Tashtyk culture was published in Human Genetics. Six Tashtyk remains of 100–400 AD from Bogratsky region, Abakano-Pérévoz I, Khakassia were surveyed, of which 5 yielded genetic ancestry and pigmentation alleles. 

All specimens examined were determined to be female. Extractions of mtDNA from three individuals  resulted in their assignment to the Western Eurasian haplogroups HV, H, and T1, while the other two carried the East Asian haplogroups haplogroup C and N9a. Of the Tashtyk specimens which yielded pigmentation data, the majority (4) were predicted to have blue eyes and blond or light brown hair, including those with an Asian haplogroup. All specimens were determined to be of primarily  European ancestry based on the analysis of 10 SNPs.

References
Citations

Sources
Christian, David. A History of Russia, Central Asia and Mongolia. Blackwell Publishers, 1999.

Leonid Kyzlasov. Tashtyk Era (Таштыкская эпоха). Moscow, 1953. Page 13.
"Oglakhty". Great Soviet Encyclopaedia, 3rd ed. 1969-1978.
"Tashtyk culture". Great Soviet Encyclopaedia, 3rd ed. 1969-1978.

External links 
Finds from Oglakhty in the Hermitage Museum

Archaeological cultures of Siberia
Archaeological sites in Russia
Iranian archaeological cultures